Nana Grizol is an American indie folk band based in Athens, Georgia, signed to Orange Twin Records. In addition to frontman Theo Hilton (Defiance, Ohio), Nana Grizol features Laura Carter (Elf Power, Neutral Milk Hotel), Robbie Cucchiaro (The Music Tapes, Neutral Milk Hotel), Jared Gandy (Witches), drummer Matte Cathcart and Kate Mitchell, Ian Rickert, Patrick Jennings and Michael Schneeweis (Michael Jordan Touchdown Pass). Solo artist Madeline Adams also appears on Love It Love It.

Nana Grizol released their debut album, Love It Love It on May 13, 2008. Their second album, Ruth, was released on January 10, 2010. Their third album Ursa Minor was released in 2017. A compilation of early recordings was released in 2019, titled Theo Zumm. Their fifth album South Somewhere Else, which was released on June 26, 2020, was announced with the release of the single Future Version.

Members

Current
 Theo Hilton - vocals, electric guitar, acoustic guitar (2003–present)
 Madeline Adams - vocals, bass (2007–present)
 Laura Carter - drums, trumpet, clarinet (2007–present)
 Matte Cathcart - drums (2007–present)
 Jared Gandy - bass, guitar (2007–present)
 Patrick Jennings - piano, rhodes (2007–present)
 Robbie Cucchiaro - trumpet, euphonium, guitar, bari sax (2009–present)

Former
 Kate Mitchell - trumpet (2007-2009)
 Ian Rickert - clarinet, harmonica (2007-2009)
 Margaret Child - glockenspiel, tambourine (2007-2009)
 Michael Schneeweis - writing (Ruth)
 Emily Simpson - vocals  (Nightlights I-III+Tacoma Center 1600)
 Lacey Jon - percussion

Discography

References

External links 
 Nana Grizol page at Orange Twin Records
 Nana Grizol Official

Indie rock musical groups from Georgia (U.S. state)
Musical groups from Athens, Georgia
Don Giovanni Records artists